This is a list that encompasses and includes all leaders and rulers in the history of Ukraine. This page includes the titles of the Grand Prince of Kyiv, Grand Prince of Chernigov, Grand Prince of Pereiaslavl, Grand Prince of Galicia–Volhynia, Hetman of Ukraine and President of Ukraine. The following list begins with the leaders who ruled over the territory of Ukraine during Antiquity and is followed by the princes who ruled the principalities that constituted Kyivan Rus and continues with the presidents of Ukraine.

The territory has been known by a plethora of names, it has been known historically as: Kyivan Rus, Rus', the Kingdom of Galicia-Volhynia, the Zaporozhian Host and the Hetmanate. The sovereigns of these fluctuating political entities have accordingly been described in a variety of ways: knyaz, knyahinya, korol, hetman and president. Two of the earliest noble titles: knyaz and velyky knyaz translate into English as "Prince" and "Grand Prince" respectively, whilst korol translates into 'king'.

The list includes its presidents both before and after the Soviet era, and the Soviet leaders themselves, who, unlike the presidents, were not formal heads of state. Ukraine has had only eight presidents since 1917, divided into two periods (1917–1921 and 1991–present). In between, the country was a part of the Soviet Union (1922–1991) with the name of Ukrainian Soviet Socialist Republic.

Kyivan Rus' (c. 375/800 – 1240/1362)

Legendary and historical rulers of Kyiv

Rurik Dynasty

The Rurikids were descendants of Rurik (Ukrainian: Рюрик) (Hrørekr), a Varangian pagan konung or chieftain, who according to the Primary Chronicle was invited to rule Novgorod in 862 and who came to become the ruler of the Northern Slavic tribes of the (Krivchians and Slovene) as well as the Finnish tribes (Meria, Chud and Ves). Later his son or grandson, Prince Ihor, became the Prince of separate Kyivan territories to the south beginning the rule of the Riurykide dynasty of Kyivan Rus. The existence of Rurik is a point of contention for historians, P. Kovaletsky and Omeljan Pritsak believe that Rurik was the same person as Hroereckr (Rorik), the 9th century Norse king of Jutland and Frisia and that pervasive myths and legends about him formed the basis for the primary chroniclers. Alternatively, Alexsei Shakmatov accepts the Primary Chronicle's account as factual and Rurik is a historic being.

Table of rulers
(Note: Here the numbering of the princes is the same for all principalities, as all were titled Princes of Rus', despite of the different parts of land and its particular numbering of the rulers. The princes are numbered by the year of their (first) succession.)

Kings and Princes of Galicia-Volhynia (1199–1349)

Galicia-Volhynia was a Ruthenian state in Galicia and Volhynia. Depending on the title of the ruler it was called either principality or kingdom. The first king, Coloman of Galicia-Lodomeria, was crowned in 1215, although the first nominal king of Galicia was Andrew II of Hungary, the son of Béla III of Hungary, who reigned from 1188 to 1190.

In 1349, Liubartas lost all territories, except for eastern Volhynia, to Casimir III of Poland. In 1366, a Polish-Lithuanian treaty was signed: eastern Volhynia with Lutsk retained under Liubartas' rule (the Grand Duchy of Lithuania), while Galicia, western Volhynia, and western Podolia were annexed by the Crown of the Kingdom of Poland.

In the Grand Duchy of Lithuania (1362–1569) and Kingdom of Poland (1569–1667/1793)

Princes of Kiev

In the early 1320s, a Lithuanian army led by Gediminas defeated a Slavic army led by Stanislav of Kiev at the Battle on the Irpen' River, and conquered the city. The Tatars, who also claimed Kiev, retaliated in 1324–1325, so while Kiev was ruled by a Lithuanian prince, it had to pay a tribute to the Golden Horde. Finally, as a result of the Battle of Blue Waters in 1362, Kiev and surrounding areas were incorporated into the Grand Duchy of Lithuania by Algirdas, Grand Duke of Lithuania.

Algimantas Alšėniškis (Olgimunt Holszański, Olgimont-Mykhailo Olshansky) (1324–1331)
Fiodor of Kiev a.k.a. Teodoras Butvydaitis, brother of Gediminas (1331–1362)
Vladimiras Algirdaitis (Volodymyr Olgerdovych) (1362–1394)
Skirgaila (1395–1397)
Ivan Olshansky (Jonas Alšėniškis) (1397–c. 1402)
Jurgis Gedgaudas; lt (Jerzy Giedygołd) (1404–1411)
Andriy Ivanovych Olshansky (c. 1412–c. 1422)
Mykhailo Ivanovych Olshansky (1422–1432)
Mykhailo Semenovych Boloban Olshansky (1433–1435)
Švitrigaila (1435–c. 1440), Grand Duke of the Rus' (1432–c. 1440)
Aleksandras Olelka (Olelko Volodymyrovych) (1443–1454)
Simonas Olelkaitis (Semen Olelkovych) (1454–1471)

Voivodes of Kiev

When the Polish–Lithuanian Commonwealth was formed by the Union of Lublin in 1569, Kiev and surrounding areas, Podolia, Volhynia, and Podlaskie, as the Kiev Voivodeship, Bratslav Voivodeship, Volhynian Voivodeship, and Podlaskie Voivodeship, were transferred from Lithuania to Poland.

Hetmans of Ukrainian Cossacks (1506–1775)

A Hetman was a military and civil leader, democratically elected by the Cossacks.

Hetmans and commanders of Ukrainian Cossacks
Several Cossack regiments were operating in Ukraine at this time that were largely independent of each other, so some of the Hetmans' tenures overlap.

Hetmans of the Cossack state
Following the Khmelnytsky uprising a new Cossack republic, the Hetmanate, was formed.

Hetmans during the Ruin
The Ruin (1660–1687) was a time in Ukrainian history when the country fell into disarray and chaos. Afterwards, the Cossack state emerged as a vassal of the Russian Empire. During this period a number of hetmans stayed in power for short periods of time and often controlled only parts of the country. Moreover, the Treaty of Andrusovo (1667) split the Cossack Hetmanate along the Dnieper River into Left-bank Ukraine, which enjoyed a degree of autonomy within the Tsardom of Russia; and Right-bank Ukraine which remained part of the Polish–Lithuanian Commonwealth, and at times (1672–1699) part of the Ottoman Empire.

In the Russian Empire (1667/1793–1917), in the Habsburg monarchy, Austrian Empire and Austria-Hungary (1526/1772–1918)
After the dissolution of the Cossack Hetmanate, a new Malorossiyan collegium was established in 1764, and the Zaporozhian Host was disbanded in 1775. As a result of the second and third Partitions of Poland in 1793 and 1795, eastern and central parts of the territory of present-day Ukraine were incorporated directly into the Russian Empire. The western part became part of the Habsburg monarchy earlier, in the following order: Carpathian Ruthenia (1526/1699), Galicia (1772), and Bukovina (1775).

Non-Soviet leaders of Ukraine 1917–1991

Ukrainian People's Republic (1917–1921)
The Ukrainian People's Republic was formed after the Russian Revolution of 1917, and lasted until the Peace of Riga between Poland and Soviet Russia in March 1921.  The state leadership position title varied and, despite a rather widespread misconception, none of them had an official Presidential title.

The Directorate of Ukraine was a provisional council of the UNR formed after Skoropadskyi's Hetmanate fell apart. On 22 January 1919, the Act of Unification of the Ukrainian People's Republic and the West Ukrainian People's Republic was passed. The text of the universal was made by the members of the Directory.

Western Ukrainian People's Republic (1918–1919)
The government of the Western Ukrainian People's Republic, which was proclaimed on 19 October 1918, united with the Ukrainian People's Republic on 22 January 1919, although this was mostly a symbolic act because the western Ukrainians retained their own Ukrainian Galician Army and government structure.  After the Polish-Ukrainian War, Poland took over most of territory of the West Ukrainian People's Republic by July 1919.

President of Carpatho-Ukraine

Ukrainian People's Republic in exile (1920–1992)
In Paris and Prague to 1945; Munich 1945–1992 and New York City 1945–1946 and then in the last part of 1992:

Ukrainian State (1941)
Prime Minister of the Ukrainian State:

Soviet leaders of Ukraine (1918/1921–1991)
Ukraine was incorporated into the Union of Soviet Socialist Republics on 30 December 1922.

Head of state
The nomenclature for the head of state position was changing. At first it was called as the chairman of the Central Executive Committee, then it was called as the Uprising Nine (Povstanburo) which was later reorganized into the Central Military-Revolutionary Committee (sort of revkom). In mid July 1918 there were some biases about the idea of the Ukrainian SSR, but with the help of more nationally inclined bolsheviks such as Skrypnyk, Zatonsky, and others the government of the Soviet Ukraine was preserved. After the defeat of Directoria the head of state was again called as the chairman of the Central Executive Committee. Since 1938 the position began to be called as the chairman of the Presidium of Verkhovna Rada which was abolished in 1990. From 1990 to 1991 it was simply the head of the Verkhovna Rada until the introduction of the office of the President of Ukrainian SSR.

The Communist Party (Bolsheviks) of Ukraine (CP(b) U) leaders

The following list is composed of the secretary of the Central Committee of the party who were the leaders of the Party. The position also was changing names between being called the First Secretary or the general secretary, depending on a political atmosphere in the Soviet Union. The position was not officially of the head of state, but certainly was very influential, especially within the republic. The longest serving secretary was Vladimir Shcherbitsky with some 17 years as the head of the Communist Party, the second best is split between Stanislav Kosior and Nikita Khrushchev, both of which have 11 years.

Mykola Oleksiiovych Skrypnyk (20 April – 26 May 1918, Secretary of the Organizational Bureau)

Ukraine (1991–present)

On 5 July 1991, the Verkhovna Rada of the Ukrainian SSR passed a law establishing the post of the President of the Ukrainian SSR.  The title was changed to the President of Ukraine upon the proclamation of independence (24 August 1991). The first election of the President of Ukraine was held on 1 December 1991.

See also
List of Ukrainian rulers
Prime Minister of Ukraine
Cabinet of Ministers of Ukraine
Igor Zhovkva

References

National leaders